The Boundary Falls is a waterfall that is located within the Gibraltar Range National Park, adjacent to the Gwydir Highway in the New England region of New South Wales, Australia.

See also

List of waterfalls of New South Wales

References

Waterfalls of New South Wales
New England (New South Wales)